Forever Gentlemen is an album produced by TF1 Musique joining well-known artists. The album was released on 21 October 2013 and includes tributes to crooners of the 1950s.

The album entered the SNEP French Albums Chart at number 2 in its first week of release.

In 2015 a compilation album of Volumes 1 and 2 was released in Canada reaching No.2 on the Canadian album chart and No.1 on the Quebec chart.

Track list

Charts

Weekly charts

Year-end charts

Singles

Forever Gentlemen Volume 2

Because of the immense success of the album, Forever Gentlemen Vol. 2  was released as a compilation album produced again by TF1 Musique and joining another set of well-known artists. The album was released on 24 October 2014, exactly a year after the release of the original album and includes tributes to crooners of the 1950s. The selection includes classics in English and  French languages and has notable participation of Paul Anka in a number of the interpretations.

The album entered the SNEP French Albums Chart at number 3 in its first week of release.

Weekly charts

Year-end charts

References

2013 compilation albums
2014 compilation albums